Saint-Fons is a commune in the Metropolis of Lyon in Auvergne-Rhône-Alpes region in eastern France. It was created in 1888 from part of the commune of Vénissieux.

Population

See also
Communes of the Metropolis of Lyon

References

Communes of Lyon Metropolis
Dauphiné